Don Camillo: Monsignor is a 1961 French-Italian comedy film directed by Carmine Gallone, starring Fernandel and Gino Cervi. The French title is Don Camillo Monseigneur and the Italian title is Don Camillo monsignore... ma non troppo. It was the fourth of five films featuring Fernandel as the Italian priest Don Camillo and his struggles with Giuseppe 'Peppone' Bottazzi, the Communist mayor of their rural town. In Monsignor, Don Camillo has become a bishop and Peppone a senator.

Plot summary

In Brescello, Don Camillo and Peppone have left for Rome, after yet another battle royal. Don Camillo has become a monsignor, while Peppone has become a national senator. Both retain their pure and provincial spirit, not suitable to the crude realities of the city, and so they both contrive to return to Brescello. While Don Camillo is planning - in secret - the wedding in a Catholic ceremony of the son of Peppone, the mayor tries to bribe the bride's father to undergo a civil wedding. Don Camillo responds with a proposed deal on the sale of a gas station. Since Peppone, being a Communist, cannot be seen to deal with money, having won the lottery, he decides to hide the ticket. Don Camillo unmasks him, and the two return to fight, as they prepare once again to leave for Rome.

Cast
 Fernandel as Don Camillo
 Gino Cervi as Giuseppe 'Peppone' Bottazzi
 Leda Gloria as Maria Bottazzi, Peppone's wife
 Gina Rovere as Gisella Marasca
 Valeria Ciangottini as Rosetta Grotti
 Saro Urzì as Brusco, the mayor
 Marco Tulli as Smilzo
 Andrea Checchi as the Roman Communist representative
 Emma Gramatica as Desolina, the old lady
 Karl Zoff as Walter "Lenin" Bottazzi, Peppone's son
 Ruggero De Daninos as a monsignore
 Carlo Taranto as Marasca, Gisella's husband
 Armando Bandini as Don Carlino
 Giuseppe Porelli as Doctor Galluzzi
 Andrea Scotti as the leader of the "Athletic Youth"

Sequel
Don Camillo in Moscow (Italian: Il compagno don Camillo; French: Don Camillo en Russie) (1965)
Don Camillo e i giovani d'oggi (French: Don Camillo et les contestataires; English translated: Don Camillo and the youth of today)  (1970) (unfinished film)

References

External links
 

1961 comedy films
1961 films
Films about Catholic priests
Films based on Italian novels
Films based on works by Giovannino Guareschi
Films directed by Carmine Gallone
French comedy films
Italian comedy films
1960s Italian-language films
French satirical films
Italian satirical films
French political satire films
Italian political satire films
Films critical of communism
Films scored by Alessandro Cicognini
1960s Italian films
1960s French films